"God Made Love" is a song co-written and recorded by American country music artist, Mel McDaniel. Recorded in June 1977 it was released in December of the year as the third and final single from McDaniel's album, Gentle to Your Senses. It peaked at number 11 on the U.S. Billboard Hot Country Singles & Tracks chart and number 12 on the Canadian RPM Country Tracks chart. It was written by Dennis Linde, Mel McDaniel, Johnny MacRae, and Len Pollard.

Chart performance

References

1977 singles
Mel McDaniel songs
Songs written by Dennis Linde
Songs written by Mel McDaniel
1977 songs
Songs written by Johnny MacRae
Capitol Records Nashville singles